C. H. Narayana Rao was an Indian actor and producer known for his works in Telugu cinema and Telugu theatre. He starred in more than fifty films in a variety of roles. His notable works include classics such as Chenchu Lakshmi (1943), Mugguru Maratilu (1946), Mana Desam (1949), Jeevitham (1950), Veelunama (1965) to name a few.

He was one of the most sought after actors in Telugu cinema before the introduction of Akkineni Nageswara Rao and N. T. Rama Rao. He produced Manjari in 1953 directed by Y. V. Rao.

Early life
He has been working in Indian Railways in 1939. He started theatre with Miss Prema B.A. written by Malladi Krishna Sharma directed by Thimmaraju Siva Rao and garnered rave reviews. At this stage, He was found by Dronamraju Kameswara Rao who introduced him to Telugu screen with the 1940 classic Jeevana Jyoti.

Filmography
 Jeevana Jyothi (1940)
 Devatha (1941) as Sukumar
 Bhakta Potana (1942) as Lord Rama
 Chenchu Lakshmi (1943) as Vishnu
 Tahsildar (1944) as Narasayya
 Swargaseema (1945)
 Mugguru Maratilu (1946)
 Jeevitham (1949) as Murthi
 Mana Desam (1949)
 Tirugubatu (1950)
 Paramanandayya Sishyulu (1950)
 Aada Janma (1951)
 Manavati (1952)
 Manjari (1953)
 Menarikam (1954)
 Rojulu Marayi (1956)
 Ganga Gauri Samvadam (1958)
 Pelli Sandadi (1958)
 Veelunama (1965)
 Rahasyam (1967)
Oke Kutumbam (1970)
Vintha Samsaram (1971)
Desoddharakulu (1973)
 Manchi Vallaki Manchivadu (1973)
Kottapeta Rowdy (1980)
Chandipriya (1980)
Madhura Swapnam (1982)

References

External links
 

Telugu male actors
1937 births
1984 deaths
Indian male film actors
Indian male stage actors
Male actors in Tamil cinema
Male actors from Chennai
Male actors in Telugu theatre
20th-century Indian male actors